Zayante may refer to several features and localities in Santa Cruz County, California.

Zayante, California, an unincorporated community
Zayante Creek, a tributary of the San Lorenzo River
Rancho Zayante, a former Mexican land grant